= William Henry Cling =

American inventor

- Born: October 1866; Charleston, South Carolina
- Died: February 25, 1937 (aged 70); Charleston, South Carolina
- Occupations: Inventor and barber

William Henry Cling (October 1866 – February 25, 1937) was an American inventor during the late 1800s and early 1900s. He is responsible for the invention and improvement of several apparel-related items as well as the creation of mechanical devices.

Cling was born in Charleston, South Carolina, shortly after the U.S. Civil War to freed slaves Edward Moulton Cling and Elizabeth Ann Richardson. He was a barber by trade, but none of his inventions were related to his craft. In several census, his race was listed as "mulatto."

In 1885, he married Sarah Elizabeth "Lulu" Lee. They had six children—Julia, Ethel, Lela, Edward, Laura and Matilda—before Lulu died of stomach cancer in 1902.

He never retired but kept working until he died of a stroke in 1937, age 72.

== Inventions ==
- Passenger register (1896) – a mechanical device for keeping track of the number of people in attendance at a theater or fair.
- Railway safety device (1905) – a device was invented to prevent head-on, or rear-end collisions of two trains moving on the same track, by providing the setting of the emergency brake.
- Improvement in coat-stays (1906)
- Improvement to the shoelace (1906) – Cling designed a shoelace containing wires which could be tied together with a twist.
- Beds (1907/1906) – beds which fold into an upright position for people who are confined to a bed due to illness or a physical injury.
